Huacaya is the one of the two breeds that make up the species Lama pacos, commonly known as the alpaca (the other breed is the Suri). Its natural range encompasses four South American countries.

Phenotype characteristics 
Both breeds are easily identifiable by their phenotypic characteristics.

Animals of the Huacaya breed have a rounded and bulky appearance. Huacaya fiber grows perpendicular to the body of the alpaca, and is bulky, smooth and dense. Its curls in its sponge-like fibre are shorter and duller compared with Suri, with an absence of wool grease that is characteristic of Corriedale sheep. Both alpaca breeds possess a vast array of coat colors, totalling 22 different varieties.

Population 
Huacayas far outnumber the Suri population. In Chile, all alpacas are of the Huacaya type, and there is a negligible amount of Suri specimens in Bolivia at the northern border. Peru, which contains the majority of the world's alpaca, has 93% Huacaya as estimated by the Food and Agriculture Organization. Thus of the 3.7 million animals worldwide, more than 90% are thought to be of the Huacaya breed.

Products

Fibre 

Huayaca fiber is made up of between 150–170 threads per . Suri fiber is marginally stronger Some of the products that can be made with fine Huacaya fiber include:
 Ponchos
 Scarves
 Vests
 Sweaters
 Bedspreads

Meat 
While huayacas were never bred for meat, their meat is a useful perfectly edible by-product and very high in protein. The carcass weight varies at around 50% of live weight and 23 kilogrammes. Huacaya are thought to produce more meat than the Suri. Alpaca meat has a high protein to fat ratio, with the most common breed containing on average 23% protein.

References 

Alpacas
Livestock
Mammals of Argentina
Mammals of Bolivia
Mammals of Chile
Mammals of Peru
Mammals of the Andes
Mammal breeds originating from Indigenous Americans